Dominik Malý (born 24 January 1996) is a Slovak footballer who currently plays for Slovan Bratislava II as a midfielder.

Club career

FK Senica
Malý made his professional Fortuna Liga's debut for FK Senica on 3 October 2014 against FK Dukla Banská Bystrica.

References

External links
 FK Senica profile
 
 Futbalnet profile

1996 births
Living people
Slovak footballers
Association football midfielders
FK Senica players
Slovak Super Liga players